Hannah Simone (born 3 August 1980) is a British-Canadian actress, television host, and former VJ and fashion model. She is known for portraying Cece Parekh on the Fox sitcom New Girl.

Early life
Simone was born in London to an Indian father and an English mother of German, Italian, and Greek Cypriot descent. She has a brother named Zack. Simone spent her early childhood in Calgary. From ages 7–10, Simone moved through three continents, attending schools in each one. At the age of 13, Simone was living in Cyprus and was working as a fashion model. At 16 years old, Simone lived in New Delhi where she attended the American Embassy School. A year later, at 17, she returned to Canada. Initially settling in White Rock, British Columbia, she subsequently relocated to Vancouver where she attended the University of British Columbia. After her first degree, she returned to Hounslow, United Kingdom for a year, where she worked as a human rights and refugees officer for the United Nations.

Career
Following her 2005 graduation from The Toronto Metropolitan University (TMU), Simone became host of HGTV Canada's television show Space for Living for its first season.

Simone worked at MuchMusic as a VJ at MuchMusic Headquarters, as a news presenter for "Much News Weekly" and, the host of the show The NewMusic. From May 2006 to November 2008, she worked as a VJ for MuchMusic in Canada. She related well to youth interested in alternative artists and interviewed many artists and bands during her time at Much. Simone stopped working at MuchMusic on 21 November 2008, stating that she had plans to move to Los Angeles, California.

Simone earned a role hosting WCG Ultimate Gamer alongside Joel Gourdin on Syfy. The series premiered on 10 March 2009 and ended after its second season on 7 October 2010. From 2011 to 2018, Simone was on Fox's comedy New Girl, where she played Cece, the best friend to title character Jess (Zooey Deschanel).

Alongside Kate Upton and Génesis Rodríguez, she was featured in Gillette's "What Women Want" campaign in 2013.

In 2014, she starred alongside Danny Trejo in Train's music video "Angel in Blue Jeans".

In 2016, she starred in music video "Same Air" from The Rocket Summer. In 2017, she hosted the reality competition television series Kicking & Screaming.

On 12 February 2018, Simone was announced as the lead in ABC's reboot of The Greatest American Hero; however, ABC declined to pick up the series.

She began cohosting Welcome to Our Show, a New Girl rewatch podcast with co-stars Lamorne Morris and Zooey Deschanel, distributed by IHeartRadio, in January 2022.

Personal life
In 2016, after dating for nearly four years, Simone married musician Jesse Giddings. Simone announced her pregnancy in April 2017, and she gave birth to their son in early August 2017.

Filmography

Film

Television

Other media

References

External links
 
 

1980 births
Living people
Actresses from London
Actresses from Vancouver
Female models from British Columbia
People from White Rock, British Columbia
British people of Indian descent
Canadian people of German descent
Canadian people of Greek Cypriot descent
Canadian people of Indian descent
Canadian actresses of Indian descent
Canadian people of Italian descent
Canadian expatriate actresses in the United States
Canadian expatriates in Cyprus
Canadian expatriate actresses in India
English emigrants to Canada
English people of German descent
English people of Greek Cypriot descent
English people of Indian descent
English people of Italian descent
Much (TV channel) personalities
Toronto Metropolitan University alumni
University of British Columbia alumni
Canadian VJs (media personalities)
Canadian women television personalities
21st-century Canadian actresses
21st-century English actresses
Canadian expatriates in England